Abcarius (also Abkariyus, Abgarios) was the surname of an Arab Armenian family of intellectuals.
Yaqub Abcarius (born Hagop Abcarian (b. 1781, Aksehir, Turkey; died 1845, Beirut, Lebanon (Syria)) was a bishop and public figure.
His son,  (1826-1885) was an author of poems and historical works. He studied in England, published the "Story of Shahriar Lion-King" ephos (1880), "Classification of Arabian poets", "Unusual events in Mountainous Lebanon in 1860" and other books.
His younger son,  (1832-1886) was a translator at the English embassy in Beirut, wrote stories and novels in Arabic, wrote "Abcarius' English-Arabic Dictionary" (1st edition pub. 1883, 605 pp.) and edited an Armenian-Arabic dictionary (published posthumously in 1887).

Sources
Armenian Concise Encyclopedia, Ed. by acad. K. Khudaverdian, Yerevan, 1990, Vol. 1, p. 10

Armenian diaspora in the Middle East
Armenian families